Botev Peak is, at  above sea level, the highest peak of the Balkan Mountains. It is located close to the geographic centre of Bulgaria, and is part of the Central Balkan National Park.

Until 1950, when it was renamed in honour of Bulgarian poet and revolutionary Hristo Botev, the peak was called Yumrukchal (Юмрукчал, from Ottoman Turkish Yumrukçal, 'a fist-like peak').

A weather station and a radio tower (opened on 10 July 1966) that covers 65% of the country are located on Botev Peak.

"Botev Peak" is the main facility of Bulgarian FM and TV broadcasting network. The situation at the top near the geographical center of Bulgaria contribute to national radio broadcasts and television broadcast here to cover more than 65% throughout the country, also in parts of Romania and Turkey.

The massif is mainly composed of granite rocks dating from the oligocene — a complex of medium acid volcanics — latites, andesites, shoshonites.

The flat ridge relief around Botev and Triglav is isolated with high slopes, which from the north (North Jendem) descend steeply from 2000 – 2200 m down, and from the south (South Jendem) — from 1800 – 1900 m.

Channels listed by frequency

Analogue radio

Digital television

Analogue television (prior to 2013)

See also
 List of European ultra prominent peaks

References

External links
 Information and pictures from Predavatel.com (Bulgarian)
 "Botev, Bulgaria" on Peakbagger

Towers in Bulgaria
Mountains of Bulgaria
Balkan mountains
Landforms of Plovdiv Province
Two-thousanders of Bulgaria